Vron is a commune in the Somme department in Hauts-de-France in northern France.

Geography

Population

Monument aux morts

The Vron Monument aux morts features a sculpture by Emmanuel Fontaine - a figure of a poilu (French soldier). A  montage of photographs, taken in March 2010, is shown below.

See also
Communes of the Somme department
War memorials (Western Somme)

References

Communes of Somme (department)